Kergrist-Moëlou is a commune in the Côtes-d'Armor department of Brittany in northwestern France.

Population

Inhabitants of Kergrist-Moëlou are called kergristois in French.

See also
Communes of the Côtes-d'Armor department
The Calvary at Kergrist-Moëlou

References

External links

Communes of Côtes-d'Armor